Saint Nicholas School is a co-educational independent day school in Old Harlow, Essex for children aged 2 1/2 to 16 years old. The current Headmaster is Mr Terry Ayres.

History

Saint Nicholas School was established in 1939 in the hamlet of Churchgate Street, near Old Harlow. The school moved premises to its current site in nearby Hillingdon House, Old Harlow in 1977. It currently educates 500 boys and girls aged 3 to 16.

Lower, middle and upper schools are each housed in their own area, within close proximity of each other, enabling access to shared facilities. The school is equipped with specialist classrooms, science laboratories, technology areas, ICT rooms, two libraries and a theatre. Sports facilities include extensive playing fields, tennis courts, a heated swimming pool and a sports hall.

Saint Nicholas School is a registered charity, managed by the Board of Governors and the Headmaster, Mr Terry Ayres.

In September 2014, the school opened a pre-school for children aged 2 1/2 to 4 years old called the Little Saints Pre-School.

References

External links
School homepage
Profile on the ISC website
ISI Inspection Reports - Saint Nicholas School

Schools in Harlow
Private schools in Essex
Educational institutions established in 1939
1939 establishments in England
Member schools of the Independent Schools Association (UK)